The Cornell Engineering Library serves the students, faculty and staff of the Cornell University College of Engineering, as well as the larger university and scholarly community. It serves the 12 schools of the College of Engineering and their approximately 3300 undergraduates, 2400 graduate students, 240 faculty, staff, and the many research centers thereof. Library liaisons are assigned from the library staff to each department. All engineering disciplines, computer science, and the earth and atmospheric sciences at the undergraduate and graduate level are included. The library, built in 1957, occupies the ground floor of Carpenter Hall (named after Walter S. Carpenter, Jr.) and two sub-levels of the building, sharing space with the Academic Computing Center (ACCEL).

History
The library is a component of the Cornell University Library.  It was started with an endowment by Walter S. Carpenter, Jr., who was associated with E. I. du Pont de Nemours and Company from 1909 until his retirement as their chairman of the Board in 1962. Carpenter was a member of the Cornell mechanical engineering class of 1910 and also served Cornell as a member of its board of trustees.  In the late 1800s there were smaller libraries housed in other buildings -  civil engineering in Lincoln Hall; electrical engineering in Franklin Hall; and mechanical engineering in Sibley Hall.

Collections
The library physical collection consists of approximately 300,000 print volumes with another 100,000 volumes and 2 million technical reports held off-site at the Library Annex. The Engineering Library's collections are tailored to research currently underway at Cornell and are described in the Engineering Library collection development policy.

Convert to virtual library 
In 2011, the library transitioned into a virtual library and study space.  High use print volumes were moved to other libraries on the Cornell campus: 20,000 volumes and course reserves were moved to Uris Library (including course reserves), and other low use items were moved to the Library Annex. The decision to become a virtual library was based on advice from an advisory committee composed of four faculty, three librarians, two graduate students, and two undergraduate students, to re-envision the library. This was announced in the Cornell Chronicle   As a result of going virtual, the library has pooled resources into enhancing electronic collections such as e-journals, e-books, society databases and other virtual services. The study space in Carpenter Hall remains open 24/7 for studying with over 100 computers in the building. Engineering librarians are on site for reference consultation.

Further reading
 Cornell Engineering: A Tradition of Leadership and Innovation p. 25  - The history of the library.
 A detailed article describing the library at its opening by Jeanette Poor, the first engineering librarian in the new Carpenter Hall Engineering Library at Cornell, is in College and Research Libraries.

References

External links 
Cornell University
Cornell Engineering Library
Uris Library
Cornell University Library
Kinematic Models for Design Digital Library (KMODDL) - an online collection developed by the library staff of models and resources for teaching the principles of kinematics (geometric motion)
The Crank, Vol. 1 & 2 - online digital scans of the student publication of Sibley College (the predecessor to the College of Engineering), published in 1887 and 1888. Later volumes also available online through Cornell Historic Monographs Collection

Libraries in New York (state)
Library
University and college academic libraries in the United States